Sunshine Coast Football Club is a semi-professional Australian soccer club based in the Sunshine Coast, Queensland. Nicknamed "The Fire", the club currently competes in the Football Queensland Premier League the third tier of Australian Football.

History
Sunshine Coast FC were founded in 2007 by Noel Woodall in order to participate in the inaugural season of the Queensland State League, a competition designed to bridge the gap between the A-League and the various regional and city-based leagues across Queensland.

Sunshine Coast kicked off in the new competition in March 2008, finding instant success as the club managed to win the inaugural Queensland State League Grand Final by defeating the Brisbane Strikers 1–0 through a goal from Bryan Gilfillan. However, after a run of injuries and difficulty in getting permits for foreign players, the Fire have had a less successful season in 2009, placed 3rd from 11 teams after 20 games, on 41 points.

In 2010 the Club again captured the Premiership and Championship.  Former head coach Richard Hudson led the Fire to the 2012 QSL Grand Final where they would capture the final Championship before the new National Premier League. Kevin Aherne-Evans took over from Richard Hudson as head coach for the 2013 and 2014 NPL Queensland seasons, before being replaced in 2015 by Paul Arnison.

In 2016 the club's form began to drop with an 11th-place finish followed by last place finishes in 2017 & 2018. Midway through the 2018 season the club replaced former Head Coach Ali Demircam with QSL winner Richard Hudson who returned to the club after a 6-year hiatus.

Richard resigned due to personal injury at the beginning of the 2019 season. Mitch Cattermole and Gary Newcome were installed as coaches for the season.

The club were relegated at the end of the 2019 NPL season to the FQPL (Football Queensland Premier League). In September 2019, the club appointed Scottish-born Gareth Thomson as head coach.

Home ground 
Sunshine Coast's playing ground is currently the Kawana Western Fields. The club share their ground with local league side Kawana Football Club.

Current squad
2020 FQPL squad as of March 2020.

Coaching staff
Senior staff at the club for the 2020 season:

Honours
 Queensland State League Premiers: 2008, 2010, 2011
 Queensland State League Grand Final Champions: 2008, 2010, 2011, 2012

References

External links
 Sunshine Coast FC Official Website
 Queensland State League
 Football Queensland
 National Premier League

National Premier Leagues clubs
Queensland State League soccer teams
Association football clubs established in 2007
Sport in the Sunshine Coast, Queensland
2007 establishments in Australia